The 2009 Clásica de Almería was the 24th edition of the Clásica de Almería cycle race and was held on 1 March 2009. The race started in Puebla de Vícar and finished in Almería. The race was won by Greg Henderson.

General classification

References

2009
2009 in road cycling
2009 in Spanish sport